Henri Marie René Leriche (12 October 1879 – 28 December 1955) was a French vascular surgeon and physiologist.

He was a specialist in pain, vascular surgery and the sympathetic trunk. He sensitized many who were mutilated in the first World war, he was the first to be interested in pain and to practice gentle surgery with as little trauma as possible.

Two symptoms have the name Algoneurodystrophy and the aortic iliac obliteration. He has trained many students, such as Michael E. DeBakey, Jão Cid dos Santos, René Fontaine et Jean Kunlino.

Biography
He came from a family of Lyonian doctors, his father Ernest Leriche is confessed near the civil court of Roanne (after studying law in Paris) and his mother Anne Chamussy, married to Leriche, belong to the elite industrial region. Rene Leriche was the third child of seven siblings. He is the brother of Marc Leriche, a French sculptor. He attended at the school of Maristes.

In 1893, he obtained a bachelor's degree in rhetoric. He then poses a question of following the footsteps of his grandfather, his great-uncle and his uncle in the path of surgery, École Militaire de Saint-Cyr to take on a military career. In March 1894, he changed his mind and wrote to his parents that he wanted to become a surgeon. He completed his bachelor of philosophy to enter the Faculty of Sciences of Lyon in November, and prepared the PCN (Physics, Chemistry, Natural Sciences).

In 1899-1900, Leriche did his military service in the 98th Infantry Regiment. He was an intern in 1902, then a doctor of medicine by supporting a thesis on the technique of surgical resection in the treatment of stomach cancer in 1906, under the direction of Antonin Poncet. In Lyon, he became friends with Alexis Carrel, whom he later meet in New York. René Leriche married Louise Héliot Calenborn on 27 September 1910 in Lyon. His wife comes from an old Germanic Catholic Family . A doctor herself, she will be his closest collaborator.

First World War
At the beginning of the war, he was assigned in a surgical ambulance automobile in the Vosges. After a short visit to Creil in a triage and regulation hospital, he was appointed to the Panthéon hospital. Then he goes to the Russian hospital in the Carlton Hotel. In April 1917, wishing for a long time return to the front, René Leriche joined Robert Proust and his team of Auto-chir (ACA n o 17). Leriche was asked by the Lyon histologist and radiobiologist Claudius Regaud to enter the training he was preparing for to serve as a "School of Medicine and War Surgery in HOE 4 de Bouleuse, near Reims.

It became such a renowned centre of instruction and improvement for all physicians and surgeons who passed it that it was decided to admit into active formation the newly-arrived Americans. René Leriche found several great names in medicine: the brilliant specialist in thoracic surgery Jean-Louis Roux-Berger (well ahead of what was done elsewhere), Lemaître who will remain the creator of the primitive suture of the wounds, the neurologist Georges Guillain, Lyon radiologist Thomas Nogier and pathologist Pierre Masson. However, he had the support for assistant Paul Santy and convert for his department of fractures and joint lesions.

A young doctor, freshly arrived, hastened to meet him: Georges Duhamel. With the help of Paul Santy, Leriche undertook very extensive research work on osteogenesis and was particularly interested in repairing fractures with experiments carried out on rabbits, and he was already pursuing scholarly reflections on the role of vasa motricity in the site of trauma. That required many cuts histological and as many X-rays or photographs, but the environment and the organization of the very large 3,000-bed field hospital permitted it. He became chief surgeon on 28 December 1917.

During the war, Leriche's idea was to differentiate the traditional white linen in which the wounded were brought from the laundry of the aseptic surgical operating rooms. He chose blue and had the surgical rooms painted blue. All the linen of the operating rooms is also blue: operating linen, casaques, caps, masks. The colour would be adopted worldwide, and the convention will make it possible to minimise infectious contamination.

Interwar period
He became a surgeon of the hospitals in Lyon in 1919. A stay in the United States allowed for him to meet Simon Flexner (who advocates "smooth" surgery) at the Rockefeller Foundation and then William Halsted in Baltimore but a number of surgeons also had an influence on him. In 1924, he was the holder of the chair at The University of Strasbourg, who responded to the call of the dean Georges Weiss after the death of Louis Sencert. He introduced the important notion of non aggressive surgery. In 1925, during his inaugural lecture at the chair of surgical clinic of the University of Strasbourg. He said that surgery should no longer be limited to the correction or removal of anatomical lesions but should address the treatment of functional disorders.

He cured and amputated Marshal Joffre at the end of his life.
 
In 1936 he succeeded Charles Nicolle at the Collège de France in Paris, where he occupied the chair of Experimental Medicine from 1937 to 1950. This enabled him to continue his research by creating a laboratory for experimental surgery and conceptualizing his theories on Physiology and pathology. In the wake of Claude Bernard, Leriche states that "the disease appears above all as a functional perversion.

Second World War
Back in Lyon after the armistice of 22 June 1940, he declined the post of health minister who was offered by the French head of state, Philippe Pétain. He, however, accepted the presidency of the National Order of Physicians, created in October 1940 by the Vichy règime, which strengthened the state's hold over the organization of medicine, supported the numerus clausus in medical studies and applied an important role in the exclusion of Jewish doctors by participating in their denunciation and especially the process of despoiling "vacant" practices.

Several years after the war, he would say that he left because he disagreed with the directive of the state. He justified his attitude by stating, like other defenders, that the régime served as a shield against the occupiers. Like many people engaged in the collaboration with Vichy, he would be hardly troubled and minimised his involvement.

Post-War
At the Liberation of France, he was expelled from the official circuits. However, he was elected a member of the Academy of Sciences and of the National Academy of Medicine in 1945.

He corrected the proofs of his autobiography shortly before his death. The book was published in 1956, under the title, chosen by the publisher, Souvenirs de ma vie morte.

Works and publications
 Thesis of medicine under the direction of Antonin Poncet, Resections of the stomach for cancer: technique, results, immediate, remote results, Lyon, 1906
 Titles and scientific work, Lyon, Imprimeries réunies, 1907 (read online [Archive])
 About the surgical treatment of the pericardial symphysis and mediastino-pericarditis, Bulletin de la Surgical Society of Lyon, Paris, Masson, January 1911 (read online [Archive])
 Pure asepsis and physical
 l means in the treatment of war wounds at their various stages. Chemotherapy or Physiotherapy, Bulletin of the Surgical Society of Lyon, Paris, Masson (read online [archive]), January–February 1916
 (En) With the assistance of the consultant surgeon of the British forces in France, The treatment of fractures, vol. 1, University of London Press (read online [archive])
 (En) With the assistance of the consultant surgeon of the British forces in France, The treatment of fractures, vol. 2, University of London Press (read online [archive])
 (En) Some researches on the peri-arterial sympathetics, Annals of Surgery, October 1921 (read online [Archive])
 Surgery of the sympathetic system. Indications and results, Annals of Surgery, September 1928 (read online [Archive])
 (En) The problem of osteo-articular diseases of vasomotor origin. Hydrarthrosis and Traumatic Arthritis: Genesis and Treatment, Journal of Bone and Joint Surgery, 1928 (read online [Archive])
 (En) The Listerian Idea in 1939, British Medical Journal, 1939 (read online [Archive])
 Pain surgery, Paris, Masson & Cie, 1940
 Surgery at the Order of Life, Paris / Aix-les-Bains, O. Zeluck, 1944
 Surgery, Discipline of Knowledge, Nice, La Diane Française, 1949
 Arterial aneurysms and arteriovenous fistulas, Paris, Masson & Cie, 1949
 The philosophy of surgery, Paris, Flammarion, Bibliothèque de philosophie scientifique, 1951
 Memories of My Dead Life, Editions du Seuil, 1956

In collaboration
 Report presented by Antonin Poncet and René Leriche, Pathogenesis of spontaneous ankyloses and particularly vertebral ankyloses, French Association for the Advancement of Science, Lyon Congress, 2–7 August 1906
 ( In ) with André Morel, The Syndrome of Thrombotic Obliteration of the Aortic Bifurcation, Annals of Surgery,February 1948

Eponymy
 Leriche operation: sympathetic denervation (or sympathectomy) by arterial decortication for the treatment of arteritis of the lower limbs.
 Leriche syndrome: thrombotic obliteration of the aortic bifurcation
 Sudeck-Leriche syndrome or complex regional pain syndrome (or algoneurodystrophy).
 Classification of Leriche and Fontaine: degree in four stages of arteritis obliterans of the lower limbs
 The plane of Leriche: The surgical plane between a blood vessel adventitia and the loose areolar tissue surrounding it

Citations
 "Health is life in the silence of the organs. " (1936 18 )
 "In disease, what is less important at bottom is man. " ( French Encyclopedia, 1936)
 "Pain does not protect man. It diminishes it. " ( Surgery and Pain, 1940)
 "The study of pain leads to human medicine in all its gestures. " (1944)
 "The fight against pain is wear and tear ... To consent to suffering is a sort of slow suicide ... And there is only one pain that is easy to bear, it is that of others. "

Titles
 Doctor of Medicine (1906)
 Surgeon of the Hospitals (1919)
 Professor at the Collège de France (1936)

Decorations
 Grand Officer of the Legion of Honor
 Croix de guerre 1914-1918
 Interallied Medal 1914-1918
 Commemorative War Medal 1914-1918

Other honors
 International Medicine of Surgery (1931)
 Lister Medal  (in) 19 (1939)
 Member of the Academy of Sciences (1945)
 Member of the National Academy of Medicine (1945)

Hommage
 A lane and a pavilion of the civil hospital of Strasbourg bear its name.
 Postal Stamp, designed by André Spitz, engraved by René Cottet, issued by France on 27 January 1958.

Bibliography
 Losardo RJ et al. Alfonso Roque Albanese: Latin American Pioneer of Heart Surgery. Tribute from the Pan American Association of Anatomy. Int. J. Morphol.. 2017;35(3):1016-1025.

References

1870 births
1955 deaths
People from Roanne
Academic staff of the Collège de France
French surgeons
Academic staff of the University of Strasbourg
Members of the French Academy of Sciences